Robert Peters may refer to:
 Robert Peters (bigamist) (died 2005), British conman and de-frocked minister
 Robert Peters (writer) (1924–2014), American poet, critic, scholar, actor and playwright
 Bob Peters (born 1937), American ice hockey coach
 Robert Peters (RAF officer) (born 1940), Royal Air Force officer
 Robert Henry Peters (1946–1996), Canadian ecologist and limnologist
 Robert L. Peters (born 1954), Canadian graphics designer and industrial designer
 Robert Peters (actor) (born 1961), American actor and director
 Robert Peters (cyclist) (born 1970), Antiguan cyclist
 Robert O. Peters (born 1973), Nigerian film producer, director and actor
 Robert Peters (politician) (born 1985), member of the Illinois Senate